Finn Maginness (born 23 February 2001) is an Australian rules footballer who plays for the Hawthorn Football Club in the Australian Football League (AFL). Finn is a 3rd generation Hawk as his father and grandfather played football with the club.

Early career 
Maginness played for the Sandringham Dragons in 2019 and also represented Vic Metro in four games across that year's national carnival. He also played for his school Scotch College, Melbourne and was captain of the First XVIII.

AFL career 
Hawthorn secured Maginness under the father-son rule, after matching 's bid with Pick 29 in the 2019 AFL Draft.  

Maginness had to negotiate a difficult COVID-19 affected season. He showed promise during the pre-season games and with scratch matches against other AFL clubs. His patience was rewarded with a round 17 debut against .

Personal life
Finn's father Scott played 131 games for Hawthorn between 1988–1996. His grandfather Norm played 64 games between 1953 and 1958.

Maginness currently studies a Bachelor of Commerce/Bachelor of Laws at Deakin University.

Statistics
Updated to the end of the 2022 season.

|-
| 2020 ||  || 32
| 1 || 0 || 0 || 2 || 8 || 10 || 0 || 5 || 0.0 || 0.0 || 2.0 || 8.0 || 10.0 || 0.0 || 5.0 || 0
|-
| 2021 ||  || 32
| 2 || 0 || 0 || 5 || 10 || 15 || 1 || 5 || 0.0 || 0.0 || 2.5 || 5.0 || 7.5 || 0.5 || 2.5 || 0
|-
| 2022 ||  || 32
| 16 || 3 || 7 || 108 || 93 || 201 || 41 || 57 || 0.2 || 0.4 || 6.8 || 5.8 || 12.6 || 2.6 || 3.6 || 0
|- class="sortbottom"
! colspan=3| Career
! 19 !! 3 !! 7 !! 115 !! 111 !! 226 !! 42 !! 67 !! 0.2 !! 0.4 !! 6.1 !! 5.8 !! 11.9 !! 2.3 !! 3.5 !! 0
|}

Notes

References

External links
 

Hawthorn Football Club players
2001 births
Living people
Australian rules footballers from Victoria (Australia)
Box Hill Football Club players
People educated at Scotch College, Melbourne